Punta rock, or Belizean punta, is a form of Garifuna music originating in Belize and created by Pen Cayetano. Songs are usually sung in Belizean Kriol or Garifuna and rarely in Spanish or English. Many Garifuna American artists and bands perform the genre as well.

Origins
Punta rock is a subgenre of punta that was created by Pen Cayetano in Belize in 1978. Punta is a style of traditional music and dance that developed among the Garifuna people of Saint Vincent, Honduras, Belize, Guatemala, and Nicaragua.

While this style is unique, calypso and soca have had some influence on it. Like calypso and soca, punta rock was used for both social commentary and risqué humor, though the initial wave of punta acts eschewed the former. Punta rock is played at parties, celebrations, parks, and other outdoor locations. Lord Rhaburn and the Cross Culture Band were integral in the acceptance of punta by Belizeans (namely Kriols) through their performance of calypso songs about punta.

Notable artists
Belizean
 Pen Cayetano
 Andy Palacio
 Paul Nabor

Honduran
 Aurelio Martínez
 Banda Blanca

References

Garifuna music
Belizean music